Sandra de Oliveira (born 19 September 1973) is a Brazilian handball player. She competed in the women's tournament at the 2000 Summer Olympics.

References

1973 births
Living people
Brazilian female handball players
Olympic handball players of Brazil
Handball players at the 2000 Summer Olympics
Sportspeople from Rio de Janeiro (city)
Handball players at the 2003 Pan American Games
Pan American Games medalists in handball
Pan American Games gold medalists for Brazil
Medalists at the 2003 Pan American Games
21st-century Brazilian women